Michael Schulze (born 30 October 1962) is a former Australian rules footballer who played with Geelong in the VFL/AFL during the late 1980s and early 1990s.

Schulze, originally from Grovedale, played mostly as a centre half back and was in that position when Geelong lost the 1989 VFL Grand Final. He made a total of 91 senior appearances for Geelong.

References 
 
 Holmesby, Russell and Main, Jim (2007). The Encyclopedia of AFL Footballers. 7th ed. Melbourne: Bas Publishing.

1962 births
Living people
Australian rules footballers from Victoria (Australia)
Geelong Football Club players
Grovedale Football Club players
Burnie Hawks Football Club players